Gorzeń Górny  is a village in the administrative district of Gmina Wadowice, within Wadowice County, Lesser Poland Voivodeship, in southern Poland.

The village has a population of 277. The village of Gorzeń was first mentioned in 1390 and was differentiated into two parts after the 16th century (since the 19th century known respectively as Gorzeń Dolny and Gorzeń Górny.

There is a manor house from the late 18th century, where Emil Zegadłowicz used to live and work.

References

Villages in Wadowice County